Jean-Paul Garraud (born 27 February 1956) is a French politician serving as a Member of the European Parliament (MEP) since 2019. A cofounder of The Popular Right, he is former member of the National Assembly, where he represented the 10th constituency of Gironde from 2002 to 2012.

A magistrate by occupation, he was a member of the Union for a Popular Movement (UMP) from 2002, later The Republicans (LR). Since 2019, he has been an Independent. In the 2019 European Parliament election, he was elected on the National Rally (RN) list along with other Independents, most notably Thierry Mariani. In 2021, Marine Le Pen announced she would appoint Garraud as Minister of Justice were she to win the 2022 presidential election.

Garraud will lead the RN list in the 2021 regional election in Occitania; he received support from two influential politicians in the region for the list's leadership: Perpignan Mayor Louis Aliot and Béziers Mayor Robert Ménard.

References

1956 births
Living people
Members of the Regional Council of Occitania (administrative region)
Union for a Popular Movement politicians
The Republicans (France) politicians
National Rally (France) politicians
The Popular Right
Deputies of the 12th National Assembly of the French Fifth Republic
Deputies of the 13th National Assembly of the French Fifth Republic
MEPs for France 2019–2024
National Rally (France) MEPs
Knights of the Ordre national du Mérite
Politicians from Toulouse